Worden is an unincorporated community in Douglas County, Kansas, United States.  It is located seven miles west of Baldwin City and nine miles east of Overbrook along U.S. Highway 56.

History
Worden had a post office from 1884 until 1904.

The abandoned SM-65 Atlas-E missile site 548–2 is located roughly 1.9 miles southwest of Worden.

Education
Until 2011, USD 348 in Baldwin maintained the Marion Springs Elementary School, which was located in Worden.

References

Further reading

External links
 Douglas County maps: Current, Historic, KDOT

Unincorporated communities in Douglas County, Kansas
Unincorporated communities in Kansas